Pterostylis metcalfei, commonly known as Metcalfe's greenhood, or Ebor greenhood is a species of orchid that is endemic to the Northern Tablelands of New South Wales. As with similar greenhoods, the flowering plants differ from those which are not flowering. The non-flowering plants have a rosette of leaves flat on the ground but the flowering plants have a single flower with leaves on the flowering spike. This greenhood has a dark green and white striped flower and is known from only three locations. It is listed as an endangered species.

Description
Flowering occurs from March to May.

Taxonomy and naming
The description was published in The Orchadian. In 2002, Jones and Clements transferred the species to the genus Diplodium but the move has not been accepted by the Australian Plant Census nor by the Royal Botanic Gardens, Kew. The specific epithet (metcalfei) honours the collector of the type specimens, Peter Metcalfe.

Distribution and habitat
It is found on ridges and slopes with well drained soil derived from granite and basalt, growing among grass and shrubs. It is known from only three locations, only one of which is in a national park, so that it is threatened by cattle grazing and trampling.

Conservation status
The Scientific Committee of the Office of Environment and Heritage, established by the Threatened Species Conservation Act, has listed P. metcalfei as "endangered" under the New South Wales Government Biodiversity Conservation Act 2016.

References

metcalfei
Endemic orchids of Australia
Orchids of New South Wales
Plants described in 1997
Taxa named by David L. Jones (botanist)